Daniel Cadena Sanchez (born 9 February 1987 in Sanlúcar de Barrameda, Cádiz, Andalucia, Spain) is a football forward who currently plays for Spanish team Mérida AD and the Nicaragua national football team.

Club career
A much-travelled striker, Cadena has spent most of his playing career in Spain but he has also played club football in Nicaragua.

International goals

Scores and results list Nicaragua's goal tally first.

References

External links
 Daniel Cadena at playmakerstats.com (English version of ceroacero.es)
 lapreferente.com
 laprensa.com.ni

1987 births
Living people
Sportspeople from the Province of Huelva
Nicaraguan men's footballers
Nicaragua international footballers
Spanish footballers
Spanish emigrants to Nicaragua
Association football forwards
Footballers from Andalusia
Naturalized citizens of Nicaragua
Nicaraguan people of Spanish descent
C.D. Walter Ferretti players
Expatriate footballers in Nicaragua
2014 Copa Centroamericana players
2017 Copa Centroamericana players
2017 CONCACAF Gold Cup players
Spanish expatriate footballers
Spanish expatriate sportspeople in the Dominican Republic
Spanish expatriate sportspeople in Iceland
Expatriate footballers in the Dominican Republic
Expatriate footballers in Iceland
Njarðvík FC players
Liga Dominicana de Fútbol players
Divisiones Regionales de Fútbol players
2019 CONCACAF Gold Cup players